The Renewable Transport Fuel Obligation (RTFO) in the United Kingdom is a requirement on transport fuel suppliers to ensure that 5 per cent of all road vehicle fuel is supplied from sustainable renewable sources by 2010. The Government intends to set variable targets for the level of carbon and sustainability performance expected from all transport fuel suppliers claiming certificates for biofuels in the early years of the RTFO.

The announcement to introduce the Obligation was made on 10 November 2005, using powers included in the Energy Act 2004. It came into force on 15 April 2008. In mid-2005, biofuel made up 0.25% of overall road fuel sales, around 50% of it imported.

In practice, the Renewable Transport Fuel Obligation will mostly be achieved by blending fossil fuels with bioethanol, biomethanol or biodiesel – derived from sources such as palm oil, oilseed rape, cereals, sugar cane, sugar beet, and reprocessed vegetable oil – or biomethane. Almost all existing vehicles are able to run on a 5% blend in liquid fuels,  in some cases with fuel system adjustments. Natural gas vehicles can run on pure biomethane. Consideration should also be given to the effect of biofuel constituents on fuel system parts such as rubber hoses, particularly in older or classic vehicles. Flexible Fuel Vehicles, currently more common in the Americas than in Europe, are able to use blends of up to 85% ethanol in the U.S. and Canada, and up to 100% hydrous ethanol in Brazil.

The requirement that the biofuel sources should be sustainable is also important. In South America and Asia, the production of biofuels for export has in some cases resulted in significant ecological damage, including the clearing of rainforest.

In the future, the Department for Transport estimate that up to 1/3 of the fuel in the UK transport sector could be produced from home-grown biofuels. In addition to contributing to cutting carbon emissions, the use of biofuels is seen as widening the country's fuel diversity and increasing fuel security.

The RTFO will help bring the UK into line with European Union biofuels directive, which sets targets for all EU countries for biofuel usage of 2% by the end of 2005 and 5.75% by the end of 2010.

Implementation 

The RTFO will be implemented through a certification scheme administered by the Department for Transport. Companies certified as having sold more than the 5% obligation will be able to sell their certificates for the excess to those who sold less.

See also 

 Biodiesel in the United Kingdom
 Climate change
 Energy use and conservation in the United Kingdom
 Energy policy of the United Kingdom
 Hybrid vehicle
 Peak oil
 Low-carbon fuel standard

References

External links 

 Department for Transport/RTFO
 Text of the Renewable Transport Fuel Obligations Order 2007 from the Office of Public Sector Information
 Department for Transport Renewable Transport Fuel Obligation feasibility report
 BioenergyWiki page on the RTFO
 Critique of Government biofuels policy

In the media 

 26 July 2006, The Guardian Biofuels fires up its Teesside production
 2 November 2005, The Times, All cars will run on 'biofuel' mix by 2010
 May 2002, European Environmental Bureau, Biofuels not as green as they sound
 23 November 2004,  Feeding Cars, Not People, George Monbiot Feeding Cars, Not People

Flexible-fuel vehicles
Politics of the United Kingdom
Road transport in the United Kingdom
Biofuel in the United Kingdom
Transport policy in the United Kingdom